The 2011 Royal Bank of Scotland Challenger was a professional tennis tournament played on hard courts. It was the fifth edition of the tournament which was part of the 2011 ATP Challenger Tour. It took place in Tiburon, United States between 10 and 16 October 2011.

ATP entrants

Seeds

 1 Rankings are as of October 3, 2011.

Other entrants
The following players received wildcards into the singles main draw:
  Steve Johnson
  Daniel Kosakowski
  Denis Kudla
  Jack Sock

The following players received entry as a special exempt into the singles main draw:
  Alex Kuznetsov

The following players received entry from the qualifying draw:
  Alex Bogdanovic
  Pierre-Ludovic Duclos
  Alejandro González
  Artem Sitak

Champions

Singles

 Ivo Karlović def.  Sam Querrey, 6–7(2–7), 6–1, 6–4

Doubles

 Carsten Ball /  Chris Guccione def.  Steve Johnson /  Sam Querrey, 6–1, 5–7, [10–6]

External links
Official Website
ITF Search
ATP official site

Royal Bank of Scotland Challenger
Tiburon Challenger
2011 in American tennis
2011 in sports in California